Joan Blackham (15 May 1946 – 6 September 2020) was a British actress with a long stage, film and television career.

Education

Blackham attended The Alice Ottley School, Worcester and was head of Carroll house.

Career
Blackham was a professional actress and supply teacher, including special needs. She studied at the New College of Speech and Drama in London and with the Open University. She was a board member of Women in Film and Television UK and co-produced script-reading sessions for its Writers' Group.

Selected stage, film and television appearances

Stage
Calendar Girls (Chichester/National tour, West End, 2008) – Brenda Hulse/Lady Cravenshire
Jane Eyre (Shared Experience at the West Yorkshire Playhouse, Leeds, 1999) – Mrs Reed/Mrs Fairfax
The Man of Mode (RSC) – Lady Townley
The Love of the Nightingale (RSC) – Queen/Chorus
King Lear (RSC) – Goneril
Across Oka (RSC) – Margaret

Film

Keep the Aspidistra Flying (1997) – Librarian
Bridget Jones's Diary (2001) – Shirley
Mothers and Daughters (2004) – as Paddy, a mother who just can't help but meddle
Twisted Sisters (2006) – Jennifer's mother
These Foolish Things (2006) – Mrs. Griffin
The Sweeney (2012) – Landlady
The Knot (2012) – Aunt Claire
Battle for Sevastopol (2015) - Eleanor Roosevelt
A Prominent Patient (2017)

Television
Doctors (2012) Season 13, Episode 182 Baby Steps – Eleanor Lawson
Midsomer Murders (2011) Season 13, Episode 7 Not in My Back Yard – Maureen Stubbs
Judge John Deed (2003–2006) 8 episodes over 3 seasons – Lady Vera Everard
Inspector Morse (1993) The Twilight Of The Gods - Helen Buscott
Home to Roost (1987) Series 3, 6 Episodes – Fiona Fennell
Chocky's Challenge (1986) All 6 episodes – Mrs. Gibson
Sweet Sixteen (1983) All 6 episodes – Jane
Take a Letter, Mr. Jones (1981) All 6 episodes – Ruth
To the Manor Born (1980) Season 2, Episode 2 The Spare Room – Diana 'Podge' Hodge, a glamorous divorcee
The Fall and Rise of Reginald Perrin (1977) Season 2, Episode 4 The Unusual Shop and Episode 5 Re-Involvement – Miss Erith

See also
 List of people from Wolverhampton

References

External links

Women in Film and Television UK

1946 births
2020 deaths
Actors from Wolverhampton
British Shakespearean actresses
English film actresses
English stage actresses
English television actresses
English voice actresses
People educated at The Alice Ottley School
Royal Shakespeare Company members